Hale is a town in eastern Tanzania. It belongs to Mnyuzi ward in Korogwe district. It is the location of the major falls of Pangani River and a hydroelectric power station.

Latitude -5.2833 Longitude 38.6000 Altitude (feet) 830 Lat (DMS) 5° 16' 60S Long (DMS) 38° 36' 0E Altitude (meters) 252

Transport 
Hale is on the A14 highway Dar es Salaam - Chalinze - Tanga. 
It is served by a junction station on a cross-country line of the national railway system.

See also 
 Railway stations in Tanzania

References 

Populated places in Tanga Region